The 2004 UCI Mountain Bike & Trials World Championships were held in Les Gets, a ski station in the French Alps, from 8 to 12 September 2004. The disciplines included were cross-country, downhill, four-cross, and trials. The event was the 15th edition of the UCI Mountain Bike World Championships and the 19th edition of the UCI Trials World Championships.

Julien Absalon won the elite men's cross-country, the first of his five elite world titles. The bronze medal in the event was won by Thomas Frischknecht, the last of his seven medals in the category, the first of which having been his silver medal in the inaugural UCI Mountain Bike World Championships in 1990.

Reigning UCI World Cup and Olympic champion Gunn-Rita Dahle won the elite women's cross-country, the second of her four elite world titles. She became the first and so far only woman to win the Olympic Games, UCI World Championship, and UCI World Cup in the same year. Alison Sydor won the bronze medal, the last of her ten medals in the event.

The junior men's cross country was won by future Olympic mountain bike champion and five-time elite world champion Nino Schurter, in front of Frenchmen Stéphane Tempier and Maxime Marotte.

The elite women's downhill was won by Vanessa Quin of New Zealand. Anne-Caroline Chausson, who had won the previous eight world titles, did not start the event due to an injury sustained in training. Fabien Barel of France won the elite men's downhill after Steve Peat, who had been first in qualifying, crashed near the finish while leading by more than a second.

Daniel Comas became the first Spanish UCI World Champion in the men's 26" trials, an event previously dominated by French riders. Fellow Spaniard Benito Ros Charral won the second of his ten world titles in the men's 20" trials. Swiss rider Karin Moor won the fourth of her nine world titles in the women's trials.

Medal summary

Men's events

Women's events

Team events

Medal table

See also
UCI Mountain Bike Marathon World Championships

References

External links

 Results for the mountain-bike events on cyclingnews.com
 Results for the trials events on uci.ch

UCI Mountain Bike World Championships
International cycle races hosted by France
UCI Mountain Bike and Trials World Championships
Mountain biking events in France